Olaf Tyaransen (born 10 February 1971 in Dublin) is an Irish journalist and a contributing editor with Dublin's Hot Press magazine.

Career
Tyaransen was born in Dublin on 10 February 1971. His family moved to Galway in 1977, where he attended Coláiste Éinde on Threadneedle Road. He contributed film reviews to the local free Galway Advertiser in 1988, and edited another local freesheet called The Word. He began writing for Dublin's Hot Press magazine in 1991; and held the position of their ‘Writer-At-Large’.

Books
Tyaransen's first book, a poetry collection entitled The Consequences of Slaughtering Butterflies, was published by Salmon Poetry in 1992. In 2000, he released The Story Of O (which he described as "an accidental autobiography"), which was published by Hot Press magazine and books.

In October 2001, Tyaransen visited Ukraine to report on the phenomenon of internet bridal agencies. The resulting report was published in Sex Lines (2002), published by Hot Press.

Politics
Tyaransen is a campaigner for the legalisation of drugs, and regularly writes on this subject and engages in radio, television and university debates. In 1997, Tyaransen formed the Cannabis Legalisation Party with UCC law lecturer Tim Murphy, and stood in the Irish general election as a candidate for the Dublin constituency of Dún Laoghaire.  He polled just 348 first preference votes, but said his intention was to make a point. The Cannabis Legalisation Party has since disbanded and he is not affiliated with any other political party.

Notes

1971 births
Living people
The Herald (Ireland) people
Hot Press people
Irish writers
People educated at Coláiste Éinde
People from County Dublin
People from County Galway
Sunday Independent (Ireland) people